The 2003–04 Red Stripe Bowl was the 30th edition of what is now the Regional Super50, the domestic limited-overs cricket competition for the countries of the West Indies Cricket Board (WICB). It ran from 1 to 19 October 2003, with matches played in Antigua and Barbuda and Jamaica.

Ten teams contested the competition, divided into two groups of five. For a third consecutive season, Antigua and Barbuda entered as a separate team, with the remaining Leeward Islands players competing for a "Rest of Leeward Islands" team. A University of the West Indies team entered for the second and final time, while the West Indies under-19s competed for the first time. Canada were invited as the sole international guest team. The semi-finals and final of the competition were all held in Discovery Bay, Jamaica, with Guyana eventually defeating Barbados in the final to win their eighth domestic one-day title. Guyanese batsman Ramnaresh Sarwan led the tournament in runs, while four bowlers (Dinanath Ramnarine, Pedro Collins, Ian Bradshaw, and Mahendra Nagamootoo) were the joint leading wicket-takers.

Squads

Group stage

Zone A

Zone B

Finals

Semi-finals

Final

Statistics

Most runs
The top five run scorers (total runs) are included in this table.

Source: CricketArchive

Most wickets

The top five wicket takers are listed in this table, listed by wickets taken and then by bowling average.

Source: CricketArchive

References

2003 in West Indian cricket
2003–04 West Indian cricket season
Regional Super50 seasons
Domestic cricket competitions in 2003–04